The 1935 International Cross Country Championships was held in Auteuil, France, at the Hippodrome d'Auteuil on March 23.  An unofficial women's championship was held in Morecambe, England on March 20, 1935, but only a report on the men's event was given in the Glasgow Herald.

Complete results for men, and for women (unofficial), medallists, 
 and the results of British athletes were published.

Medallists

Individual Race Results

Men's (9 mi / 14.5 km)

Women's (1.9 mi / 3.0 km)

Team Results

Men's

Women's

Participation

Men's
An unofficial count yields the participation of 61 male athletes from 7 countries.

 (9)
 (9)
 (9)
 (8)
 (9)
 (9)
 (8)

Women's
An unofficial count yields the participation of 11 female athletes from 2 countries.

 (6)
 (5)

See also
 1935 in athletics (track and field)

References

International Cross Country Championships
International Cross Country Championships
Cross
International Cross Country Championships
International Cross Country Championships
Cross country running in France
Cross country running in the United Kingdom